Hiltz is a surname. Notable people with the surname include:

Fred Hiltz, Primate of the Anglican Church of Canada
Nichole Hiltz (born 1978), American actress
Starr Roxanne Hiltz, Professor of Information Science/Information Systems at New Jersey Institute of Technology
W. W. Hiltz, Mayor of Toronto in 1924

See also
Hiltz Squared Media Group, Canadian television and film production and distribution company based in Toronto